Karen Harris is an American television writer for the ABC Daytime serial General Hospital.

Career
During the 2007–2008 Writers Guild of America strike, she chose not to accept Financial Core status.

She wrote television pilots for Spelling Television and Universal Pictures (1979-1987), and worked at Sony Pictures Television, Lorimar Television (1988–1989) and Columbia Pictures (1989–1990; A Peaceable Kingdom). While at Universal, Harris was a Writer-Producer-Supervising Producer-Executive Producer on The Incredible Hulk.
 Simon & Simon
 Shannon
 Knight Rider
 Street Hawk
 The Human Factor 
 Alfred Hitchcock Presents
 Scene of the Crime
 Island Sons 
 Baby Brokers
 Creator/EP/co-writer pilot: Deadline: Madrid
 Satisfaction Guaranteed–Pilot
 American Beauty–Pilot

Reaction to Wolf's promotion: Karen Harris on her Facebook page: Oh, please. (lol) I have a new lease on life, Jami. But I walked the picket lines with a whole bunch of terrific writers. Garin Wolf quit the WGA so he could scab. This is his reward. I'm sad, because there are others there who are better writers and deserve it more.

WGA West
In September 2008, scribes elected eight new board members to the WGA West. Topping the list of winners were Army Wives writer Katherine Fugate, who received 647 votes. Also elected were John Bowman (629 votes), Howard Michael Gould (619 votes), David A. Goodman (552 votes), Karen Harris (544 votes), Mark Gunn (525 votes), Aaron Mendelsohn (498 votes) and Kathy Kiernan (463 votes). Bowman, Goodman, Gunn, Mendelsohn and Kiernan are incumbents. A total of 1,235 ballots were cast. Indie firm Pacific Election Services counted the votes.

Life in General
Life In General is a web series which debuted on October 28, 2008 on Strike.TV, an internet network created by Hollywood writers during the 2007-2008 Writers Guild of America (WGA) strike. Life In General is a scripted show set behind-the-scenes at the second longest running soap opera on TV.  The companion piece is Greenville General, the soap opera on which they all work.

In the first episode entitled "Out of Control", Courtney is missing, Rod is screwing Maddie, Rachel just found out that her husband cheated on her, and Raymond may have suffered a fatal heart attack. And that's just behind the scenes.

Positions held
All My Children (hired by Brian Frons & Megan McTavish)
Script writer: February 4, 2004 – February 24, 2005

General Hospital
Script writer: 1993–1996 (hired by Wendy Riche & Claire Labine); April 8, 2005 – January 3, 2008; March 17, 2008 – February 8, 2011
Co-head writer: (with Richard Culliton, and later Robert Guza Jr.) 1996–1997

Adventure Inc.
Supervising producer 2002–2003
Writer: two episodes

Port Charles
Head writer: February–November 2000; June 2000 – November 9, 2000 (with Barbara Bloom)
Script writer: 2002–2003
Associate head writer: November 10, 2000 – January 26, 2001
Co-head writer: 2000 (with Jonathan Estrin) PhillyMag

Life In General/Greenville General (web series/pilot (Strike.TV)
 Creator/head writer/Producer: October 28, 2008

Highlander
Writer: 1994–1996

Studio 5-B
Co-executive producer/writer: 1989

Street Hawk
Writer: 1985

The Incredible Hulk
Writer/story editor/producer: 1979–1983

Other TV series: Jack London's Tales of the South Seas; Largo Winch

Awards and nominations
Daytime Emmy Awards
Nominations: (1995–1997, 2008; Best Writing; General Hospital)
Wins: (1995; Best Writing; General Hospital)

Writers Guild of America Award
WGA wins: (1995, 1996, 1998; Best Daytime Serial; General Hospital) (shared with writer team)
WGA nominations: (1995, 1996, 1997, 1998; Best Daytime Serial; General Hospital)

References

External links

JohnAugust
Newsweek
Post-Gazette
DeadLineHollywood
LifeInGeneral

American soap opera writers
American screenwriters
American women screenwriters
Writers Guild of America Award winners
Living people
Year of birth missing (living people)
Women soap opera writers
21st-century American women writers